The testicles of calves, lambs, roosters, turkeys, and other animals are eaten in many parts of the world, often under euphemistic culinary names. Testicles are a by-product of the castration of young animals raised for meat, so they were probably a late-spring seasonal specialty, though nowadays they are generally frozen and available year-round.

Cookery
Testicles are cooked in a variety of ways: sautéed and sauced, fricasseed, deep-fried with breading or batter, in pies, poached, roasted, and so on. Before cooking, they are generally scalded, skinned, and soaked in cold water.

Names
In English, testicles are known by a wide variety of euphemisms, including "stones", "Rocky Mountain oysters", and "prairie oysters". Lamb testicles are often called 'lamb fries' or simply fries (though that may also refer to other organ meats).

Euphemisms are used in many other languages. In Arabic countries such as Lebanon and Syria or Iraq they are known as "baid ghanam"  and in Turkey they are known as koç yumurtası  which in both languages means sheep eggs.

In some Spanish-speaking countries in Latin America, they are known as criadillas, huevos de toro, "bull eggs";  in Chinese, as Simplified Chinese: 牛宝; Traditional Chinese: 牛寶; Pinyin: niú bǎo, "ox treasures"; in Greek, as αμελέτητα, "unmentionables"; in Hindi, as "Kapura".

The French animelles (lit. 'innards'), the Italian granelli (lit. 'granules'), and the Spanish and Latin American criadillas (lit. 'little maids') began as euphemisms, but have become standard culinary names.

World variants

Canada 
Known as 'prairie oysters' in Canada, they are normally served deep-fried and breaded, with a demi-glace.
The dish is especially popular in parts of Canada where cattle ranching is prevalent, and castration of young male animals is common.

Middle East (Levant) 
In Jordan, and Syria, baid ghanam or sheep testicles are grilled in lemon juice and garnished in parsley.

Pakistan
In Pakistan, there is a common misconception of eating goat testicles but this originated in Somalia cooked in Tava.

United States
In the United States, bull testicles are usually served breaded and deep-fried as an appetizer, under the name "Rocky Mountain oysters".

Spain 
Buffalo, boar or bulls' testicles known as criadillas are breaded and fried; In tortilla Sacromonte, a speciality from Granada, lambs' brains and testicles are cooked in an omelette.

Vietnam 
Bulls testicles is commonly called "Ngầu pín". It is a very common food as it is believed to increase men's sexual ability.

Mongolia 
After gelding a colt, the testicles are used for ritual purposes. One of the amputated testicles is punctured with a knife so as to permit the insertion of a rope; the rope is then fastened to the new gelding's tail with the assumption that once the testicle has dried, the wound will have finished healing. The remaining testicle is cooked in the hearth ashes and eaten by the head of the household to acquire the strength of the stallion.

United Kingdom 
Lamb testicles were historically eaten in England where they were referred to as 'fries' or 'stones'. As the name suggests, they were usually fried in butter after being coated in breadcrumbs. However, they are no longer widely eaten and are not available in supermarkets, although they are sold in some Asian butchers and other shops catering to British Muslims.

Iran 
Lamb testicles in Iran are called Donbalan, originally the name of a white, fleshy mushroom, which is a euphemism to avoid using the word testicles. Lamb testicles are consumed mostly as home-cooked meals rather than in restaurants as they are considered Haram (forbidden) according to Islamic laws, but there are restaurants where lamb testicles are available. In Iran, lamb testicles are mainly skewered and grilled, however in some areas they are shallow fried and served with bread.

See also
 Faggot (food)
 Milt
 Offal
 Rocky Mountain oysters
 Testicle Festival
Hasma

References

External links

Offal
Testicle